Kelaghayi, also known as "chārqad" ( from Persian چارقد), is a traditional Azerbaijani women's headgear. It is a square-shaped silk head scarf with special prints on it. In November 2014 at the 9th session of UNESCO's traditional art and symbolism of Kelaghayi, its production and the wearing were included in the list of intangible cultural heritage UNESCO.

Background

Kelaghayi is a four-cornered shawl woven from silk thread and worn by the Azerbaijani women as a symbol of chastity, respect, and devotion.  Thin silk threads are woven together on a loom, and then boiled and dried into squares.  They are dyed with vegetable dyes, and artisans use wood blocks and oils to stamp patterns.  The silk keeps the wearer cool in the summer and warm in the winter.  The process of making a kelaghayi takes two days and four separate artisans: the weaver, the dyer, the moulder (decorator), and ornamental master.  Traditionally, all the artisans involved are men.

The colours and patterns of kelaghayi often have meaning and importance for events like weddings, engagements, mourning periods, and daily life.  There are age and social differences in its wearing: older women wear kelaghayis of darker colours, mostly black and dark blue, whereas younger women opt for brighter ones, such as white, beige, bright blue, etc.  If a woman gave a kelaghayi to a man, it signified that she accepted his proposal of marriage.  She would then wear a red kelaghayi at their henna party.

A kelaghayi can be tied in various ways, depending on the region.  In some places, a kelaghayi was tied over a triangular headscarf after collecting hair with a piece of gauze. As a result, there would be three headdresses worn simultaneously: first, the juna (gauze), then the kelaghayi and finally a triangular headscarf called kasaba, sarandaz, or zarbab.

Kelaghayi-making is concentrated in two cities in Azerbaijan, the city of Sheki and the Basgal settlement in Ismayilly.  The tradition is passed down through non-formal apprenticeships, primarily through family occupation.

Silkworm breeding in Azerbaijan dates to the periods prior to Christianity. Sheki has been the centre of silkworm breeding in Azerbaijan and also in the Caucasus for many years. In the 20th century, the largest silkworm breeding plant was established in Sheki. During the reign of Nicholas II, Sheki silk was used in making new five hundred notes in Russian empire. In the year 1862, Sheki silk was awarded a medal at the international exhibition launched in London. Saint-Étienne Company of Lion city, France was one of the permanent purchasers of Sheki silk. That is why for its successes achieved in the field of silkworm breeding Sheki was called “Caucasian Lion.” The clothes, fine needle-works and shawls made of Sheki silk were highly appreciated. For this reason, the local population engaged in kelaghayi production produced silk in Sheki and created kelaghayi in Basgal. Therefore, despite a certain distance between two regions, they connected with each other by “floss ties.”

In 1870, Baskal kelaghayi was awarded a silver medal at a London exhibition.

The leading force in producing the shawl is considered a dyer. Because it requires hard work, masterly skill and delicate feeling to dye the finished kelaghayi in a hot pot. Mainly, sumaq, barberry, wild apple, saffron, currant and other plants are used in dyeing kelaghayi having 150x150 cm and 160x160 cm size.

The ornaments of kelaghayi are made by wooden or metal moulds. The edges of kelaghayi, and sometimes its central part (khoncha) are decorated with geometrical or nabati ornaments. The patterns reflected in kelaghayi have great meaning and have been remained unchanged for hundreds of years. Butas prevail over other patterns and they are one of the most widespread ornament elements in the Azerbaijan art. Researchers consider buta as a pattern belonging to the fire-worship period.

Kelaghayis of each region differ from each other with their patterns in the edges. Mainly, “Shah buta’, “saya buta’, and “khirda buta” patterns are used in Sheki and Basgal Kelaghayis. Colourful kelaghayis such as “Heyrati”, “Soghani”, “Istiotu”, “Albukhari”, “Abi”, “Yelani” gained fame in the Middle East and Caucasus peoples.

Individual forms and motives reflected in kelaghayi passed on to the daily life of the population. So, it is possible to see the elements belonged to kelaghayi in sweets and bread, tombs and gravestones.

This shawl is often met in the Azerbaijani folklore, poetry, as well as fine and decorative art. Certainly, all the above-mentioned caused to reflect kelaghayi ornaments in the art of many world peoples.

Sometimes when a man passes away he is covered with a black kelaghayi. It continues even till burial ceremony. It means that kelaghayi has been accompanying the Azerbaijan people for all their lives. This shawl also survives a peaceful mission. During the conflict arisen from different reasons, the people ceased fight when kelaghayi was thrown by a woman.

Kelaghayi is kept at the favourable place of the house. It is possible to see it at the home of the Azerbaijanis living outside the country. Because kelaghayi is a force protecting the family traditions.

Kelaghayi is such kind of shawls which is demanded every time. Kelagayi weavers think that the ornaments and design of kelaghayi are compared with Azerbaijani mughams. They believe that the use of seven colours is linked to the number of mughams. Although the fashion changes so rapidly, the size and patterns of the kelaghayi are remaining the same. It could be considered one of the long-lived shawls.

Demand for kelaghayi both in Azerbaijan and abroad survives this art up to now. Today, the dynasties continuing this type of art produce kelaghayi with pleasure in Sheki city and Basgal settlement. During different years the masters from Basgal and Sheki established the kelaghayi production not only in other regions of Azerbaijan but also in Georgia, Turkmenistan, Iran, Russia and Uzbekistan.

An initiative of “Inkishaf” (Development) Scientific Organization, “Kelaghayi” Center is operating in Basgal. All kelaghayi traditions have been restored here. Also, a unique interactive “Kelaghayi” museum was established in Basgal. The visitors are not only familiarized with the history and traditions of kelaghayi but also observe the process of production, even take part in making the product.

Kelaghayi is introduced as an essential element playing an important role in fashion and daily life of Azerbaijani people, and is represented not only at the museum located in Basgal but also at the State Museum of Oriental Art in Moscow, National Museum of History in Baku and National Art Museum of Azerbaijan.

References

Azerbaijani clothing
Headgear
Azerbaijani words and phrases
Masterpieces of the Oral and Intangible Heritage of Humanity